The men's 4 × 100 metres relay event at the 2009 Asian Athletics Championships was held at the Guangdong Olympic Stadium on November 12–14.

Medalists

Results

Heats

Final

References

Heats results
Final results

2009 Asian Athletics Championships
Relays at the Asian Athletics Championships